The Diju River is a sub- tributary of the Brahmaputra River in the Indian state of Assam.

Geography
Diju river originates in the hills of Karbi Anglong district and flows through the Karbi Anglong district and Nagaon district. Diju river meets Kolong River near at Amoni village of Nagaon district. Receiving the water from Diju river, the Kolong River become bigger and finally meets Brahmaputra River.

References 

Rivers of Assam
Rivers of India